Jérémy Lecroq (born 7 April 1995) is a French cyclist, who currently rides for French amateur team Philippe Wagner Cycling.

Major results

2015
 5th Overall ZLM Tour
2016
 8th Grand Prix de la Ville de Lillers
2017
 3rd ZLM Tour
 3rd Ronde van Vlaanderen Beloften
 3rd Paris–Bourges
 6th Grand Prix de Denain
 10th Omloop Eurometropool
2018
 1st Grand Prix de la Ville de Lillers
 5th Scheldeprijs
2020
 4th Paris–Chauny
2021
 6th Grand Prix d'Isbergues
 9th Ronde van Limburg
 9th Brussels Cycling Classic

Grand Tour general classification results timeline

References

External links

1995 births
Living people
French male cyclists
Cyclists from Paris